Longjing is a railway station on the Taiwan Railways Administration West Coast line (Coastal line) located in Longjing District, Taichung, Taiwan.

History
The station was opened on 15 December 1920.

Structure
There is an island platform at the station.
There is an overpass as of November 2017, however, it may only be accessed when station staff open the gates.

Service
Longjing Station is primarily serviced by Local Trains.

Around the station
 Taichung Power Plant

See also
 List of railway stations in Taiwan

References

1920 establishments in Taiwan
Railway stations in Taichung
Railway stations opened in 1920
Railway stations served by Taiwan Railways Administration